Social Evolution & History is a peer-reviewed academic journal focused on the development of human societies in the past, present, and future. In addition to original research articles, Social Evolution & History includes critical notes and a book review section. It is published in English twice a year, in March and September, by Uchitel Publishing House. The editors-in-chief are Dmitri Bondarenko, Leonid Grinin, and Andrey Korotayev.

Special issues
Social Evolution & History has published several special issues devoted to questions in social evolution:

 Ernest Gellner special memorial issue (guest editor: P. Skalnik)
 Exploring the Horizons of Big History (guest editor: G. D. Snooks)
 Thirty Years of Early State Research (guest editors: H. J. M. Claessen, R. Hagesteijn, P. van de Velde)
 Analyses of Cultural Evolution (guest editor: H. Barry)

Indexing
The journal is indexed in:

 Scopus
 Ulrich's database
 ERIH
 Russian Science Citation Index.

See also
 Big History

References

External links
 
 The Evolution Institute
 Researchgate.net
 Academia.edu
 Scimago Journal & Country Rank

Publications established in 2002
Social history journals
Anthropology journals
Biannual journals
English-language journals